Events of 2019 in Lithuania.

Incumbents 
 President: Dalia Grybauskaitė
 Prime Minister: Saulius Skvernelis
 Seimas Speaker: Viktoras Pranckietis

Events 
27 March:  The Vilnius Regional Court finds the Soviet Union's last defense minister, 94-year-old Dmitry Yazov, guilty of war crimes for his role in a violent crackdown on Lithuania's independence move on 13 January 1991.

Births

Deaths

References

Links
 

 
2010s in Lithuania
Years of the 21st century in Lithuania
Lithuania
Lithuania